Utricularia jamesoniana is a small perennial epiphyte carnivorous plant in the family Lentibulariaceae. It is native to Central America, the Antilles, and northern and western South America. Specifically, it can be found in Bolivia, Brazil, Colombia, Costa Rica, Ecuador, French Guiana, Guatemala, Guyana, Nicaragua, Panama, Peru, Suriname, and Venezuela and on the islands of Guadeloupe, Hispaniola, Dominica, and Martinique. The species was originally published and described by Daniel Oliver in 1860. It flowers year-round.

See also 
 List of Utricularia species

References

External links 

jamesoniana
Carnivorous plants of Central America
Carnivorous plants of South America
Epiphytes
Flora of South America
Taxa named by Daniel Oliver